Ahmed Zahir, commonly known as Seena Zahir is a Maldivian politician. He has served as Minister of Justice and as the Speaker of the People's Majlis, during the reign of President Maumoon Abdul Gayoom.

He served as the speaker of People's Majlis from 2004 to 2008.

References

Government ministers of the Maldives
Living people
Speakers of the People's Majlis
Year of birth missing (living people)